Shae Petersen, also known as "Sril Art" or just "Sril", is an American visual artist, muralist and entrepreneur who currently lives in Salt Lake City. He was the subject of an in-depth article in the periodical Salt Lake City Weekly. Petersen was the artist involved in the controversy of the creation of public art in South Salt Lake. Petersen is internationally known for his 100 ft mural tiled "godlike", as well as murals depicting "Breaking Bad", Hunter S. Thompson and Tech N9ne

Sril has been commissioned by many notable clients including Post Malone, Dan Bilzerian, Patagonia, Ricky Rubio, Utah Jazz, Reddit, BYU and Joe Ingles.

His work has earned him the awards of Best Public artist in 2014, 2015 an 2016 as well as Best Visual Artist in 2020 and 2022. Additionally his "Godlike" mural was the first ever mural to reach the #1 post on Reddit, and gained over 5 Million views.

In 2018 Sril was commissioned to create Utah's largest mural to date. Measuring 60 feet tall, 60 feet wide and beginning 15 feet from the ground.

References 

Muralists
Artists from Salt Lake City
1984 births
Living people